The Castle is a Grade II listed public house at West Street, Harrow-on-the-Hill, London.

It is on the Campaign for Real Ale's National Inventory of Historic Pub Interiors.

The Castle can trace its roots back as far as 1716. The current building dates back to 1901. The building has Heritage status, with several listed features.

References

Grade II listed buildings in the London Borough of Harrow
Grade II listed pubs in London
National Inventory Pubs
Harrow on the Hill
Pubs in the London Borough of Harrow
Fuller's pubs